Cornell Kermit Gordon (born January 6, 1941) is a former college and professional American football defensive back.  He played for the New York Jets and the Denver Broncos for eight seasons. He also is a substitute teacher for Portsmouth Public Schools.

See also
Other American Football League players

External links
New York Jets bio

1941 births
Living people
Players of American football from Norfolk, Virginia
American football cornerbacks
American football safeties
North Carolina A&T Aggies football players
New York Jets players
Denver Broncos players
American Football League players